Spoiler Shield is an iOS and Android app designed to block spoilers of popular television shows and sports games on Facebook and Twitter. Using a proprietary algorithm, Spoiler Shield filters the users Facebook and/or Twitter feeds avoiding any post that could potentially give away the outcome of a show or game. It can block spoilers from over 30 television shows (including American Horror Story, Boardwalk Empire, and Project Runway), as well as sports games from every team of the NFL, MLB and NBA. Spoiler Shield was founded by Josh Solt and Matthew Loew in 2013.

See also
 Tweetbot

References

Mobile software